In knowledge representation, a class is a collection of individuals or objects. A class can be defined either by extension (specifying members), or by intension (specifying conditions), using what is called in some ontology languages like OWL. According to the Type–token distinction, the ontology is divided into individuals, who are real worlds objects, or events, and types, or classes, who are sets of real world objects. Class expressions or definitions gives the properties that the individuals must fulfill to be members of the class. Individuals that fulfill the property are called Instances.

Relationships

Instantiation 

The instantiation relationship is a relation between objects and classes. We say that an object O, say Harry the eagle is an instance of a class, say Eagle. Harry the eagle has all the properties that we can attribute to an eagle, for example his parents were eagles, he is a bird, he is a meat eater and so on. It is a special kind of is a relationship. Its noted Concept assertion in Description logics, a family of logic based on classes, class assertion

Subsumption 
Classes can subsume each other. We say usually that if A and B are classes, and all A instances are also B instances, then B subsumes A, or A is a subclass of B, for example in the OWL Language it is called 'subclassof'.

References

See also 
 Metaclass (Semantic Web)
 Ontology
 Ontology components
 Description logic
 Type-token distinction

Knowledge representation